Daniel Egan ( – 16 October 1870) was an Australian politician who served as Mayor of Sydney in 1853. He was also a member of the New South Wales Parliament.

Egan was born in Windsor, New South Wales and was a foreman at the Government Dockyards, Sydney from 1824 to its closure in 1835. He then went into business and acquired several trading and whaling vessels but went bankrupt in 1843 and later became a wine and spirit merchant. He became an alderman of the Sydney City Council on its creation in 1842, resigning due to his bankruptcy. He returned as an alderman in 1846, rising to mayor in 1853. He purchased two  blocks of land in Beacon Hill in 1857.

Egan was elected to the Legislative Council on 1 April 1854, representing the Pastoral District of Maneroo. In April 1856 he was elected at the first election to the Legislative Assembly, representing Maneroo, which was renamed Monara in 1858. He was defeated for Monara at the 1859 election, but had been elected for the adjoining district of Eden which he held until 1869. He was defeated for Eden in December 1869, but won the election for Monara in January 1870. From 27 October 1868 until his death he was the Postmaster-General of New South Wales in the second Robertson and fifth Cowper ministries.

References

 

Mayors and Lord Mayors of Sydney
Members of the New South Wales Legislative Assembly
1870 deaths
1803 births
19th-century Australian politicians
Australian people in whaling
19th-century Australian public servants